The Canton of Fauville-en-Caux is a former canton situated in the Seine-Maritime département and in the Haute-Normandie region of northern France. It was disbanded following the French canton reorganisation which came into effect in March 2015. It had a total of 9,152 inhabitants (2012).

Geography 
An area of farming, quarrying and light industry in the arrondissement of Le Havre, centred on the village of Fauville-en-Caux. The altitude varies from 70m (Cliponville) to 153m (Alvimare) for an average altitude of 129m.

The canton comprised 18 communes:

Alvimare
Auzouville-Auberbosc
Bennetot
Bermonville
Cléville
Cliponville
Envronville
Fauville-en-Caux
Foucart
Hattenville
Hautot-le-Vatois
Normanville
Ricarville
Rocquefort
Sainte-Marguerite-sur-Fauville
Saint-Pierre-Lavis
Trémauville
Yébleron

Population

See also 
 Arrondissements of the Seine-Maritime department
 Cantons of the Seine-Maritime department
 Communes of the Seine-Maritime department

References

Fauville-en-Caux
2015 disestablishments in France
States and territories disestablished in 2015